Chera is a municipality in the comarca of Requena-Utiel in the Valencian Community, Spain. The name in Valencian is Xera, but the local language is Spanish, not Valencian.

Geographically and historically Chera was part of the Serrans comarca. Nowadays, according to the current administrative division pattern of the Valencian Community, Chera is officially part of the Requena-Utiel comarca.

See also
Sierra de Utiel

References

Municipalities in the Province of Valencia
Requena-Utiel